Elk Hills is an unincorporated community in central Kanawha County, West Virginia, United States.  It lies on U.S. Route 119 along the Elk River, between the communities of Mink Shoals and Crede.

References

Unincorporated communities in Kanawha County, West Virginia
Unincorporated communities in West Virginia